48 Air Defence Regiment is an Air Defence regiment of the Indian Army.

Formation 
The regiment was raised on 1 May 1962 under the command of Lieutenant Colonel RTK Foregard as 48 Light Anti-Aircraft Regiment at Deolali.

Equipment
At the time of its formation, the Regiment was equipped with Bofors 40 mm L-60 anti-aircraft guns. Conversion to 40 mm L/70 guns was started on 20 May 1972 and completed on 27 July 1973. The Upgraded Super Fledermaus (USFM) radar replaced the Super Fledermaus (SFM) radars in September 2000.

Operations
The regiment has taken part in the following operations-
Indo-Pakistani War of 1965: The regiment took part in Operation Ablaze and Operation Savage in the Eastern Sector. It protected airfields and critical areas, including deployment over rafts over the Brahmaputra River.
Indo-Pakistani War of 1971: The regiment served in both the Western and Eastern Sectors, covering a long period from 20 August 1971 to 12 March 1972. It protected many vital areas during this operation.
Operation Trident: The regiment took part in this massive exercise in 1987.
Operation Rakshak I: The regiment was involved in counter-insurgency roles in 1991.
Operation Rakshak II: The regiment took part in counter-insurgency operations in the Kashmir Valley between 1995 and 1997.
Operation Vijay: The regiment was actively involved between 26 May 1999 and 12 November 1999 in the Western desert. 
Operation Sahayata : The unit was deployed from 27 October 2001 to 5 November 2001 to aid the civilian authorities in the riot hit town of Malegaon 
Operation Parakram: The regiment was fully geared up during this operation between December 2001 and November 2002.
Officers and men from the regiment have been deputed for anti-terrorist operations as part of Rashtriya Rifles.

Honours and awards
The regiment has won the following awards -  
Param Vishisht Seva Medal – 1
Sena Medal – 4 
Vishisht Seva Medal – 1
Mentioned in dispatches – 1 
COAS Commendation Card – 4
CIDS Commendation Card – 1 
GOC-in-C Commendation Card – 18

References

Military units and formations established in 1962
Air defence regiments of the Indian Army
Air defence units and formations